Steen Ipsen (born 1966) is a Danish artist and teacher who works with ceramics. He generally creates his art in series, often based on natural occurrences such as crystallisation, cell division and cell fission.

Education and employment 
Steen was first admitted to the Danish School of design in Copenhagen in 1984 but changed to the Design School Kolding in 1987. He then graduated in 1990 with a degree majoring in Ceramics. 

In 2014 he had a solo exhibition at Copenhagen Ceramics, showing a series called Organic. In 2016 he exhibited his work in Paris.

Collaborative work 
In 2011 Steen made a series of works titled “Extrudox A/S” in collaboration with fellow Danish ceramicist Anne Tophøj. This work focussed on new techniques of shaping clay with the example of the extruder. Using this machine meant that the clay was heated and could be pulled in one continuous profile (in forms such piping or tubing). Together they experimented with this new way of creating, which resulted in a variety of differently shaped and coloured forms. In their statement for their exhibition at the Ann Linnemann Gallery in Copenhagen, they said “Extruding… is a here-and-now technique, where objects are finished in taste tempo as they come out of the extruder”.

Prizes 

1991: Applied Art Prize of 1879, Bronze Medal
1995: Pre-Qualified for the competition: “Ceramics for Everyday Use: Danish Arts Foundation
2007: Won Honourable Mention in the 4th World Ceramic Biennale, South Korea
2011: Annie and Otto Detlefs Foundation, The Big Ceramic Prize, Copenhagen
2013-2015 (active): Danish Arts Foundation, 3 years Working Grant

References 

1966 births
21st-century Danish ceramists
Danish male artists
Living people
People from Næstved Municipality